Marjan Television Network is a TV company owned by Manoto, a Persian-language TV channel. Based in London, it was established in 2009 as a platform from which to develop and launch a series of new television channels that would turn out content for a Persian-speaking audience.

Kayvan and Marjan Abbassi, the UK-based Iranian couple who launched Marjan TV, in 2009, stay out of the media spotlight. They and other Marjan TV officials declined to comment for this story despite repeated requests for interviews.

References

Television broadcasting companies of the United Kingdom
Companies based in the London Borough of Merton
Mass media companies established in 2009
2009 establishments in the United Kingdom